Hans Michael Jebsen (born 15 November 1956) is a Hong Kong-based Danish businessman and landowner. He joined the Jebsen Group in Hong Kong in 1981, and has been the Chairman and main shareholder of the Group since 2000. He is originally from Denmark.  He owns a large portfolio of historic properties in Denmark, including several manor houses and historic inns.

Early life and education
Jebsen was born on 15 November 1956 in Siegen, Germany. The Jebsen family is of German-Danish origin and he attended the Deutsches Gymnasium in Åbenrå before studying Economics and Business Administration at the University of St Gallen, Switzerland (1978-81).

Career
Jebsen is a director of Singapore-based Jebsen & Jessen (SEA) Pte Ltd. of the Jebsen and Jessen Family Enterprise worldwide. He is also on the board of Hysan Development Co. Ltd. and The Wharf (Holdings) Ltd. in Hong Kong.

Property in Denmark
 
Jebsen owns a large portfolio of historic properties in Denmark via the company Stenbjerg Ejendomme. His holdings include Oreby Manor on Lolland. He has previously also owned Rosendal at Præstø and Nedergård and Charlottenlund on Langeland but Rosendal is now owned by his eldest son, Michael Immanuel Jebsen, while the estates on Langeland have been ceded to another son, Casper Jebsen. Michael Immanuel Jabsen acquired Bækkeskov by Tappernøje south of Copenhagen (previously owned by the late Peter Zobel) in 2018. 

Jebsen is also the owner of a number of historic hotels and inns, including Hotel Frederiksminde and Rønnede kro on Zealand and Kalvø Badehotel, Årøsund Badehotel, Ballebro Færgekro, Dyvig Badehotel and Hotel Baltica in Sønderjylland. The restaurant of Hotel Frederiksminde holds one star in the Michelin Guide.

Philanthropy
Hans Michael Jebsen is active in various charities and NGOs. He is the Chairman of the Asian Cultural Council Hong Kong Friends’ Committee, a trustee of the World Wide Fund for Nature (WWF) in Hong Kong, as well as a member of the Advisory Board of Hong Kong Red Cross. He established the Jebsen Educational Foundation in 1995, and serves on the Corporate Advisory Board of the Hong Kong University of Science and Technology Business School.

Awards
He was awarded the Bronze Bauhinia Star of Hong Kong in 2001, the Silver Cross of the Order of Dannebrog of Denmark in 2006, the Cross of Merit of the Federal Republic of Germany in 2009, and Knight 1st class of the Order of Dannebrog of Denmark in 2014.

Since 2005, Jebsen has been an honorary citizen of Jilin City, China. In addition, he is an Honorary Fellow of the Hong Kong University of Science & Technology, and a member of the Hong Kong European Union Business Co-operation Committee for the Hong Kong Trade Development Council.

Personal life
Jebsen is married to Desirée Jebsen, a former countess of Schaffgotsch. They have five children. Several of them have attended the Herlufsholm Bording School in Denmark and featured in a Danish television documentary about the school. The family has close ties to the Danish royal family. He is a member of the Royal Danish Yacht Club and the Royal Copenhagen Shooting Society.

References

1956 births
Living people
Hong Kong businesspeople
Recipients of the Bronze Bauhinia Star
Danish expatriates in China
Recipients of the Cross of the Order of Merit of the Federal Republic of Germany
Place of birth missing (living people)